Alhaji Alhassan Tampuli Sulemana is a Ghanaian politician and member of the Eighth Parliament of the Fourth Republic of Ghana representing the Gushegu Constituency in the Northern Region on the ticket of the New Patriotic Party. He is the current Deputy Minister for Transport.

Early life and education 
Sulemana was born on 27 May 1976 and hails from Zinindo in the Northern region of Ghana. He completed his O Level in 1994 and his QCL in Barrister and Solicitor in 2011. He further had his DPA in Public Administration in 2002. He later obtained his bachelor's degree in Public Administration in 2005. He again had his LLB in General Law in 2009. In 2013, he had his master's degree in law in Energy and Environmental Law.

Career 
Sulemana was the former Chief Executive of the National Petroleum Authority.

Politics 
Sulemana is a member of the NPP and currently the MP for the Gusheigu Constituency in the Northern region. In the 2020 Ghanaian elections, he won the parliamentary seat with 30,401 votes whilst the NDC parliamentary aspirant Mohammed Yussif Malimali had 28,055 votes and the NDP parliamentary candidate Abdulai Abdul-Razak had 250 votes.

Committees 
Sulemana is a member of the Standing Orders Committee, also a member of the Business Committee and also a member of the Appointments Committee.

Personal life 
Suleman is a Moslem.

Philanthropy 
In February 2021, Sulemana pledged to build a palace in the Kpatinga Traditional area.

References 

1976 births
Living people
Ghanaian Muslims
Ghanaian MPs 2021–2025
New Patriotic Party politicians
People from Northern Region (Ghana)